Ben Frank Gates (April 12, 1920 – July 26, 1978) was an American professional basketball player who spent two seasons in the National Basketball League (NBL) and one season in the National Basketball Association (NBA). During the 1946–47 NBL season, Gates played for the Fort Wayne Zollner Pistons and later the Anderson Duffey Packers, who he re-signed with for the 1948–49 season. He attended Sam Houston State University.

References

External links

1920 births
1978 deaths
American men's basketball coaches
American men's basketball players
Anderson Packers coaches
Anderson Packers players
Basketball coaches from Texas
Basketball players from Texas
Fort Wayne Zollner Pistons players
Guards (basketball)
High school basketball coaches in Texas
People from Huntsville, Texas
Player-coaches
Professional Basketball League of America players
Sam Houston Bearkats men's basketball players